Each "article" in this category is a collection of entries about several stamp issuers, presented in alphabetical order. The entries are formulated on the micro model and so provide summary information about all known issuers.

See the :Category:Compendium of postage stamp issuers page for details of the project.

Nabha 

Dates 	1885–1948
Currency 	12 pies = 1 anna; 16 annas = 1 rupee

Refer 	Nabha in Indian Convention states

Nagorno-Karabakh 

Dates 	1993  –
Capital 	Xankändi (Khankendy/Stepanakert)
Currency 	(1993) 100 kopecks = 1 Russian rouble
		(1995) 100 louma = 1 dram

Main Article Needed

Nakhichevan 

Dates 	1993 only
Capital 	Nakhichevan
Currency 	100 qopik = 1 manat

Refer 	Azerbaijan

Namibia 

Dates 	1990 –
Capital 	Windhoek
Currency 	(1990) 100 cents = 1 rand
		(1993) 100 cents = 1 dollar

Main Article Postage stamps and postal history of Namibia

See also 	German South West Africa;
		South West Africa

Nandgaon 

Dates 	1892–1895
Currency 	12 pies = 1 anna; 16 annas = 1 rupee

Refer 	Indian Native States

Nangking & Shanghai (Japanese Occupation) 

Dates 	1941–1945
Currency 	(1941) 10 rin = 1 sen, 100 sen = 1 yen
		(1943) 100 cents = 1 dollar

Refer 	Japanese Occupation Issues

Nanumaga 

Refer 	Tuvalu

Nanumea 

Refer 	Tuvalu

Naples 

Dates 	1858–1861
Currency 	100 grana = 200 tornesi = 1 ducato

Refer 	Italian States

Natal 

Dates 	1857–1909
Capital 	Pietermaritzburg
Currency 	12 pence = 1 shilling; 20 shillings = 1 pound

Main Article Needed 

See also 	Zululand

National Front for Liberation of South Vietnam 

Dates 	1963–1976
Currency 	100 xu = 1 dong

Refer 	North Vietnam

Nauru 

Dates 	1916 –
Capital 	
Currency  	(1916) 12 pence = 1 shilling; 20 shillings = 1 pound
		(1966) 100 cents = 1 dollar

Main Article Needed

Nawanager 

Dates 	1877–1895
Currency 	6 docra = 1 anna

Refer 	Indian Native States

Neapolitan Provinces 

Dates 	1861–1862
Capital 	Naples
Currency 	100 grana = 200 tornesi = 1 ducato

Refer 	Italian States

Negri Sembilan 

Dates 	1891 –
Capital 	Seremban
Currency 	100 cents = 1 dollar

Main Article Needed 

See also 	Malaysia

Nejd 

Dates 	1925–1926
Capital 	Riyadh
Currency  	40 paras = 1 piastre

Refer 	Saudi Arabia

See also 	Hejaz–Nejd

Nepal 

Dates 	1881 –
Capital 	Kathmandu
Currency 	(1881) 16 annas = 1 rupee
		(1907) 64 pice = 1 rupee
		(1954) 100 paisa = 1 rupee

Main Article Needed

Netherlands 

Dates 	1852 –
Capital 	Amsterdam
Currency 	(1852) 100 cents = 1 gulden (florin)
		(2002) 100 cent = 1 euro

Main Article  Postage stamps and postal history of the Netherlands

Netherlands Antilles 

Dates 	1949–2010
Capital 	Willemstad
Currency 	100 cents = 1 gulden (florin)

See also 	Aruba;
		Caribbean Netherlands;
		Curaçao (Curaçao and Dependencies);
		Curaçao (island country);
		Sint Maarten;

Netherlands Indies 

Dates 	1864–1948
Capital 	Batavia (Djakarta)
Currency 	100 cents = 1 gulden (florin)

Main Article Needed

Netherlands Indies (Japanese Occupation) 

Dates 	
Currency 	100 sen (cents) = 1 rupee (gulden)

Refer 	Japanese Occupation Issues

Netherlands New Guinea 

Dates 	1950–1962
Capital 	Hollandia (Djayapura)
Currency 	100 cents = 1 gulden (florin)

Main Article Needed 

See also 	Netherlands Indies;
		West Irian;
		West New Guinea

Nevis 

Dates 	1980 –
Capital 	Charlestown
Currency 	100 cents = 1 dollar

Main Article Needed 

Includes 	Nevis (British Colonial Issues)

See also 	St Christopher Nevis & Anguilla

Nevis (British Colonial Issues) 

Dates 	1861–1890
Capital 	Charlestown
Currency 	12 pence = 1 shilling; 20 shillings = 1 pound

Refer 	Nevis

New Amsterdam 

Refer 	French Southern & Antarctic Territories

New Brunswick 

Dates 	1851–1868
Capital 	Fredericton
Currency  	(1851) 12 pence = 1 shilling; 20 shillings = 1 pound
		(1860) 100 cents = 1 dollar

Refer 	Canadian Provinces

New Caledonia 

Dates 	1860 –
Capital 	Noumea
Currency 	100 centimes = 1 franc

Main Article Needed

New Carlisle (Gaspé) 

Dates 	1851 only
Currency 	12 pence = 1 shilling; 20 shillings = 1 pound

Refer 	Canadian Provinces

Newfoundland 

Dates 	1857–1949
Capital 	St John's
Currency  	(1857) 12 pence = 1 shilling; 20 shillings = 1 pound
		(1861) 100 cents = 1 dollar

Main article  Postage stamps and postal history of Newfoundland

Refer 	Canadian Provinces

New Granada 

Dates 	1861 only
Capital 	Bogotá
Currency 	100 centavos = 1 peso

Refer 	Colombian Territories

New Guinea (Australian Administration) 

Dates 	1925–1942
Capital 	Rabaul
Currency 	12 pence = 1 shilling; 20 shillings = 1 pound

Refer 	Papua New Guinea

New Hebrides 

Dates 	1908–1980
Capital 	Vila
Currency  	(1908) French and British used concurrently
		(1938) 100 gold centimes = 1 gold franc
		(1977) 100 centimes = 1 franc

See also 	Vanuatu

New Republic 

Dates 	1886–1888
Capital 	Vrijheid
Currency 	12 pence = 1 shilling; 20 shillings = 1 pound

Refer 	Transvaal

New South Wales 

Dates 	1850–1913
Capital 	Sydney
Currency 	12 pence = 1 shilling; 20 shillings = 1 pound

See also 	Australia

New York 

Refer 	United Nations (UN)

New Zealand 

Dates 	1855 –
Capital 	Wellington
Currency 	(1855) 12 pence = 1 shilling; 20 shillings = 1 pound
		(1967) 100 cents = 1 dollar

Main Article Needed

New Zealand Territories 

Main Article Needed 

Includes 	King Edward VII Land;
		Victoria Land

NF 

Refer 	Nyasa–Rhodesian Force (NF)

Nicaragua 

Dates 	1862 –
Capital 	Managua
Currency 	(1862) 100 centavos = 1 peso
		(1925) 100 centavos = 1 cordoba

Main Article Needed

Niger 

Dates 	1959 –
Capital 	Niamey
Currency 	100 centimes = 1 franc

Main Article Needed 

Includes 	Niger (French Colony)

See also 	French West Africa

Niger (French Colony) 

Dates 	1921–1944
Capital 	Niamey
Currency 	100 centimes = 1 franc

Refer 	Niger

Niger Coast Protectorate 

Dates 	1892–1902
Capital 	Enugu
Currency 	12 pence = 1 shilling; 20 shillings = 1 pound

Refer 	Nigerian Territories

Nigeria 

Dates 	1914 –
Capital 	Lagos
Currency 	(1914) 12 pence = 1 shilling; 20 shillings = 1 pound
		(1973) 100 kobo = 1 naira

Main Article Needed

Nigerian Territories 

Main Article Needed 

Includes 	Biafra;
		Lagos;
		Niger Coast Protectorate;
		Northern Nigeria;
		Oil Rivers Protectorate;
		Southern Cameroons;
		Southern Nigeria

References

Bibliography
 Stanley Gibbons Ltd, Europe and Colonies 1970, Stanley Gibbons Ltd, 1969
 Stanley Gibbons Ltd, various catalogues
 Stuart Rossiter & John Flower, The Stamp Atlas, W H Smith, 1989
 XLCR Stamp Finder and Collector's Dictionary, Thomas Cliffe Ltd, c.1960

External links
 AskPhil – Glossary of Stamp Collecting Terms
 Encyclopaedia of Postal History

Nabha